Killer Clans is a 1976 Hong Kong martial arts film directed by Chor Yuen and produced by the Shaw Brothers Studio. The film is loosely based on the novel Liuxing Hudie Jian by Gu Long.

Cast
 Chung Wa
 Chen Ping
 Ku Feng
 Yueh Hua
 Lo Lieh
 Wong Chung
 Cheng Li
 Fan Mei Sheng
 Yeung Chi Hing
 Ling Yun
 Alan Chui Chung-San

References

External links
 IMDb entry
 HK Cinemagic entry

1976 films
1976 martial arts films
1970s martial arts films
Shaw Brothers Studio films
Films directed by Chor Yuen
Kung fu films
Hong Kong martial arts films
Films based on works by Gu Long
1970s Hong Kong films